The Long John is a bar-shaped, yeast risen pastry like a doughnut either coated entirely with glaze or top-coated with cake icing. They may be filled with custard or creme. The term Long John is used in the Midwestern U.S. and Canada, and has been used in Texas.

In other parts of the United States and Canada, such as the Mid-Atlantic and Central Canada, Long Johns are sometimes marketed as "éclairs"; the two pastries look similar but are created with different types of dough (steam-puffed vs. yeast-risen) and sometimes different fillings (the éclair may have chiboust cream). The éclair has (usually chocolate) fondant icing.

On the American West Coast and British Columbia, Long Johns are called bars or bar doughnuts, such as the maple bar and the chocolate bar (depending on the frosting). Filled Long Johns are called filled bars, or filled bar doughnuts.  For example, an unfilled (or even custard-filled) Long John with maple-flavored icing is called a maple bar in California. They may also be topped with chopped bacon and called a maple bacon bar.

Some parts of the American Midwest also call this type of pastry a finger doughnut or cream stick when filled.

See also

 List of doughnut varieties
 List of breakfast foods 
 List of foods made from maple
Boston cream doughnut, the round cream filled donut, with chocolate
Cruller, the German American rectangular donut with a twisted shape
Éclair (pastry)
Fritter, another doughnut-like pastry

References

American desserts
Stuffed desserts
American doughnuts
Canadian doughnuts
Cuisine of the Midwestern United States